Mabbutt is a surname. Notable people with the surname include:

Gary Mabbutt (born 1961), English footballer, son of Ray and brother of Kevin
Kevin Mabbutt (born 1958), English footballer
Ray Mabbutt (1936–2016), English footballer

See also
Mabbott